Neocenchrea is a genus of derbid planthoppers in the family Derbidae. There are about five described species in Neocenchrea.

Species
These five species belong to the genus Neocenchrea:
 Neocenchrea bakeri (Mc Atee, 1924) c g
 Neocenchrea heidemanni (Ball, 1902) c g b
 Neocenchrea mero Fennah, 1952 c g
 Neocenchrea ochracea Metcalf, 1945 c g
 Neocenchrea pallida Metcalf, 1938 c g
Data sources: i = ITIS, c = Catalogue of Life, g = GBIF, b = Bugguide.net

References

Further reading

External links

 

Auchenorrhyncha genera
Derbinae